Dakota Dickerson (born December 2, 1996) is an American racing driver. He won the 2018 Formula 4 United States Championship and 2019 F3 Americas Championship.

Racing record

Career summary

* Season still in progress.

Motorsports career results

American open–wheel racing results

U.S. F2000 National Championship

Complete WeatherTech SportsCar Championship results
(key) (Races in bold indicate pole position; results in italics indicate fastest lap)

References

External links
  
 

 

1996 births
Living people
Racing drivers from San Diego
U.S. F2000 National Championship drivers
American sportspeople of Japanese descent

Formula Regional Americas Championship drivers
GT World Challenge America drivers
WeatherTech SportsCar Championship drivers
Newman Wachs Racing drivers
JDC Motorsports drivers
Michelin Pilot Challenge drivers
United States F4 Championship drivers
Andretti Autosport drivers